Ego:X is the 10th album by the music group Diary of Dreams. It was released on August 26, 2011.

Tracklist

Credits 
From Discogs.
 Mastered By – Diary Of Dreams, Guido Fricke, Rainer Assmann
 Painting – Gaun:A
 Producer – Daniel Myer, Diary Of Dreams
 Recorded By [Drums] – Guido Fricke
 Violin – Ray W. (tracks: 2, 8)
 Vocals [Guest] – Amelia Brightman (tracks: 8)
 Words By [Spoken] – Martin Keßler
 Words By [Verification] – Kirsten Borchardt
 Words By, Music By, Written-By, Performer – Diary Of Dreams

References

Diary of Dreams albums
Accession Records albums
2011 albums